Walter Thomas Booton (born 13 January 1941 in Worcestershire, England) is a former English cricketer. A left-handed batsman and right-arm fast-medium bowler, he played just once for Ireland, a first-class match against Scotland in June 1970.

References
CricketEurope Stats Zone profile
Cricket Archive profile
Cricinfo profile

1941 births
Living people
English cricketers
Ireland cricketers